Gil Stein may refer to:

Gil Stein (archaeologist), American archaeologist and current director of the Oriental Institute at the University of Chicago
Gil Stein (ice hockey) (1928–2022), former president of the National Hockey League

See also 
Jill Stein (born 1950), US Green politician
 Jill Stein (restaurateur), British restaurateur for The Seafood Restaurant, and interior designer